Polyphemus is a collection of science fiction, fantasy and horror stories by American writer  Michael Shea.  It was released in 1987  by Arkham House.  It was published in an edition of 3,528 copies and was the author's first hardcover book.  Most of the stories originally appeared in The Magazine of Fantasy and Science Fiction.

Contents

Polyphemus contains the following stories:

"Foreword", by Algis Budrys
 "Polyphemus"
 "The Angel of Death"
 "Uncle Tuggs"
 "The Pearls of the Vampire Queen"
 "The Horror on the #33"
 "The Extra"
 "The Autopsy"

Reception
Chris Gilmore suggested readers unfamiliar with Shea's work "will do best to approach him through the showcase collection Polyphemus".

David Pringle described Polyphemus as "colourful SF stories, mostly latter-day bug-eyed monster tales and all with a fantastic or horrific tinge" and compared Shea's work to that of Clark Ashton Smith and Jack Vance. Pringle rated Polyphemus two stars out of four.

"The Autopsy" was adapted by David S. Goyer for the Netflix horror anthology show Guillermo del Toro's Cabinet of Curiosities (2022). It was directed by David Prior, and starred F. Murray Abraham as Dr. Carl Winters, Glynn Turman as sheriff Nate Craven, and Luke Roberts as Elliott Sykes.

References

Sources

1987 short story collections
Science fiction short story collections
Fantasy short story collections
Horror short story collections